Hluchová ( or Głuchowa) is a 12.3 km long creek in Frýdek-Místek District, Moravian-Silesian Region, Czech Republic. It is the right tributary of the Olza, to which it enters in Bystřice. It originates near the border with Poland and flows through the municipalities of Nýdek and Bystřice.

References

Rivers of the Moravian-Silesian Region
Populated places in Frýdek-Místek District
Cieszyn Silesia